Evita, vida y obra de Eva Perón is an Argentine historical comic book by Héctor Germán Oesterheld and Alberto Breccia, which narrates the biography of Eva Perón. It was censored at the time of creation and was published after Oesterheld's death.

Editorial story
The Argentine comic book authors Héctor Germán Oesterheld and Alberto Breccia started in 1968 a number of comic books devoted to the biographies of important people of Latin American history. The first issue was Vida del Che, and it was about Che Guevara. When it was finished and published, they started working in one for Eva Perón. However, when Che's comic book was published, it was removed from distribution and all copies of it were destroyed. Facing such situation, Oesterheld stopped the whole project. Although Oesterheld had finished the script and Breccia the drawings, the production was not finished.

Two years later, Breccia received a new offer to draw a comic book about Eva Perón. It had a politically neutral script, whereas the one by Oesterheld had a radical peronist style. The art was the same than in the unpublished comic book, but being coloured, whereas the original was meant to be a black and white comic book.

In 1978, during Argentina's last civil-military dictatorship (1976-1983), Oesterheld was illegally kidnapped, disappeared and later murdered by the dictatorship. His daughters were also arrested and disappeared, as were his sons-in-law. Only HGO's wife, Elsa, escaped the family's tragic fate. Alberto Breccia died in 1993, when democracy was again ruling in Argentina.

In 2002, the editor Javier Doeyo found the original script written by Oesterheld at the house of Breccia's widow, while searching for material for another project. With this script, he could restore the original unpublished comic book. The art was already published as described, and the colours were removed to restore the originally intended black & white by using image editing software. The script received minor corrections, fixing outdated information. For instance, the fate of Evita's corpse was still unknown in 1968, whereas by 2002 it had been recovered and placed at La Recoleta cemetery.

The work was thus published in 2002 by Doedytores. In 2007 it was edited again by Clarín, along with work about Che, as part of a series of reprints of noteworthy comic books.

Description
The comic book describes the life of Eva Perón in a biographical manner, from birth to death. It has a strong peronist point of view, and is highly critical of the military and other political forces. It does not employ the common techniques of the genre, and hasn't any speech balloons or sequential art. The drawings are used merely to illustrate the events being described by the text. Alberto Breccia would explain that "My work is testimonial, it can't be otherwise, because it includes characters like Goulart, Frondizi, Mao...".<ref>"Mi trabajo es testimonial, no podría ser de otra manera porque aparecían personajes como Goulart, Frondizi, Mao..." (Breccia) Doeyo, "Palabras del editor".</ref>

Some pictures are made from famous photos or iconography of the time. For example, the first image (used by Doeyo to design the comic book cover) is based upon the cover of Evita's autobiography, La Razón de mi Vida''.

Bibliography

References

Argentine comics titles
Cultural depictions of Eva Perón
1968 comics debuts
Comics about women
Comics based on real people
Comics by Héctor Germán Oesterheld
Biographical comics
Non-fiction graphic novels
Books published posthumously
Comics set in the 1910s
Comics set in the 1920s
Comics set in the 1930s
Comics set in the 1940s
Comics set in the 1950s
Comics set in Argentina